Natural gallium (31Ga) consists of a mixture of two stable isotopes: gallium-69 and gallium-71. The most commercially important radioisotopes are gallium-67 and gallium-68.

Gallium-67 (half-life 3.3 days) is a gamma-emitting isotope (the gamma ray emitted immediately after electron capture) used in standard nuclear medical imaging, in procedures usually referred to as gallium scans. It is usually used as the free ion, Ga3+. It is the longest-lived radioisotope of gallium.

The shorter-lived gallium-68 (half-life 68 minutes) is a positron-emitting isotope generated in very small quantities from germanium-68 in gallium-68 generators or in much greater quantities by proton bombardment of 68Zn in low-energy medical cyclotrons, for use in a small minority of diagnostic PET scans. For this use, it is usually attached as a tracer to a carrier molecule (for example the somatostatin analogue DOTATOC), which gives the resulting radiopharmaceutical a different tissue-uptake specificity from the ionic 67Ga radioisotope normally used in standard gallium scans.

List of isotopes 

|-
| 56Ga
| style="text-align:right" | 31
| style="text-align:right" | 25
| 55.99491(28)#
|
| p
| 55Zn
| 3+#
|
|
|-
| 57Ga
| style="text-align:right" | 31
| style="text-align:right" | 26
| 56.98293(28)#
|
| p
| 56Zn
| 1/2−#
|
|
|-
| 58Ga
| style="text-align:right" | 31
| style="text-align:right" | 27
| 57.97425(23)#
|
| p
| 57Zn
| 2+#
|
|
|-
| 59Ga
| style="text-align:right" | 31
| style="text-align:right" | 28
| 58.96337(18)#
|
| p
| 58Zn
| 3/2−#
|
|
|-
| 60Ga
| style="text-align:right" | 31
| style="text-align:right" | 29
| 59.95706(12)#
| 70(10) ms
| β+
| 60Zn
| (2+)
|
|
|-
| 61Ga
| style="text-align:right" | 31
| style="text-align:right" | 30
| 60.94945(6)
| 168(3) ms
| β+
| 61Zn
| 3/2−
|
|
|-
| 62Ga
| style="text-align:right" | 31
| style="text-align:right" | 31
| 61.944175(30)
| 116.18(4) ms
| β+
| 62Zn
| 0+
|
|
|-
| 63Ga
| style="text-align:right" | 31
| style="text-align:right" | 32
| 62.9392942(14)
| 32.4(5) s
| β+
| 63Zn
| (3/2−)
|
|
|-
| 64Ga
| style="text-align:right" | 31
| style="text-align:right" | 33
| 63.9368387(22)
| 2.627(12) min
| β+
| 64Zn
| 0(+#)
|
|
|-
| style="text-indent:1em" | 64mGa
| colspan="3" style="text-indent:2em" | 42.85(8) keV
| 21.9(7) μs
|
|
| 2+
|
|
|-
| 65Ga
| style="text-align:right" | 31
| style="text-align:right" | 34
| 64.9327348(9)
| 15.2(2) min
| β+
| 65Zn
| 3/2−
|
|
|-
| 66Ga
| style="text-align:right" | 31
| style="text-align:right" | 35
| 65.931589(3)
| 9.49(7) h
| β+
| 66Zn
| 0+
|
|
|-
| 67Ga
| style="text-align:right" | 31
| style="text-align:right" | 36
| 66.9282017(14)
| 3.2612(6) d
| EC
| 67Zn
| 3/2−
|
|
|-
| 68Ga
| style="text-align:right" | 31
| style="text-align:right" | 37
| 67.9279801(16)
| 67.71(9) min
| β+
| 68Zn
| 1+
|
|
|-
| 69Ga
| style="text-align:right" | 31
| style="text-align:right" | 38
| 68.9255736(13)
| colspan=3 align=center|Stable
| 3/2−
| 0.60108(9)
|
|-
| rowspan=2|70Ga
| rowspan=2 style="text-align:right" | 31
| rowspan=2 style="text-align:right" | 39
| rowspan=2|69.9260220(13)
| rowspan=2|21.14(3) min
| β− (99.59%)
| 70Ge
| rowspan=2|1+
| rowspan=2|
| rowspan=2|
|-
| EC (0.41%)
| 70Zn
|-
| 71Ga
| style="text-align:right" | 31
| style="text-align:right" | 40
| 70.9247013(11)
| colspan=3 align=center|Stable
| 3/2−
| 0.39892(9)
|
|-
| 72Ga
| style="text-align:right" | 31
| style="text-align:right" | 41
| 71.9263663(11)
| 14.095(3) h
| β−
| 72Ge
| 3-
|
|
|-
| style="text-indent:1em" | 72mGa
| colspan="3" style="text-indent:2em" | 119.66(5) keV
| 39.68(13) ms
| IT
| 72Ga
| (0+)
|
|
|-
| 73Ga
| style="text-align:right" | 31
| style="text-align:right" | 42
| 72.9251747(18)
| 4.86(3) h
| β−
| 73Ge
| 3/2−
|
|
|-
| 74Ga
| style="text-align:right" | 31
| style="text-align:right" | 43
| 73.926946(4)
| 8.12(12) min
| β−
| 74Ge
| (3-)
|
|
|-
| style="text-indent:1em" | 74mGa
| colspan="3" style="text-indent:2em" | 59.571(14) keV
| 9.5(10) s
|
|
| (0)
|
|
|-
| 75Ga
| style="text-align:right" | 31
| style="text-align:right" | 44
| 74.9265002(26)
| 126(2) s
| β−
| 75Ge
| (3/2)−
|
|
|-
| 76Ga
| style="text-align:right" | 31
| style="text-align:right" | 45
| 75.9288276(21)
| 32.6(6) s
| β−
| 76Ge
| (2+,3+)
|
|
|-
| 77Ga
| style="text-align:right" | 31
| style="text-align:right" | 46
| 76.9291543(26)
| 13.2(2) s
| β−
| 77Ge
| (3/2−)
|
|
|-
| 78Ga
| style="text-align:right" | 31
| style="text-align:right" | 47
| 77.9316082(26)
| 5.09(5) s
| β−
| 78Ge
| (3+)
|
|
|-
| rowspan=2|79Ga
| rowspan=2 style="text-align:right" | 31
| rowspan=2 style="text-align:right" | 48
| rowspan=2|78.93289(11)
| rowspan=2|2.847(3) s
| β− (99.911%)
| 79mGe
| rowspan=2|(3/2−)#
| rowspan=2|
| rowspan=2|
|-
| β−, n (.089%)
| 78Ge
|-
| rowspan=2|80Ga
| rowspan=2 style="text-align:right" | 31
| rowspan=2 style="text-align:right" | 49
| rowspan=2|79.93652(13)
| rowspan=2|1.697(11) s
| β− (99.11%)
| 80Ge
| rowspan=2|(3)
| rowspan=2|
| rowspan=2|
|-
| β−, n (.89%)
| 79Ge
|-
| rowspan=2|81Ga
| rowspan=2 style="text-align:right" | 31
| rowspan=2 style="text-align:right" | 50
| rowspan=2|80.93775(21)
| rowspan=2|1.217(5) s
| β− (88.11%)
| 81mGe
| rowspan=2|(5/2−)
| rowspan=2|
| rowspan=2|
|-
| β−, n (11.89%)
| 80Ge
|-
| rowspan=2|82Ga
| rowspan=2 style="text-align:right" | 31
| rowspan=2 style="text-align:right" | 51
| rowspan=2|81.94299(32)#
| rowspan=2|0.599(2) s
| β− (78.5%)
| 82Ge
| rowspan=2|(1,2,3)
| rowspan=2|
| rowspan=2|
|-
| β−, n (21.5%)
| 81Ge
|-
| rowspan=2|83Ga
| rowspan=2 style="text-align:right" | 31
| rowspan=2 style="text-align:right" | 52
| rowspan=2|82.94698(32)#
| rowspan=2|308(1) ms
| β− (60%)
| 83Ge
| rowspan=2|3/2−#
| rowspan=2|
| rowspan=2|
|-
| β−, n (40%)
| 82Ge
|-
| rowspan=2|84Ga
| rowspan=2 style="text-align:right" | 31
| rowspan=2 style="text-align:right" | 53
| rowspan=2|83.95265(43)#
| rowspan=2|0.085(10) s
| β−, n (70%)
| 83Ge
| rowspan=2|
| rowspan=2|
| rowspan=2|
|-
| β− (30%)
| 84Ge
|-
| 85Ga
| style="text-align:right" | 31
| style="text-align:right" | 54
| 84.95700(54)#
| 50# ms [>300 ns]
|
|
| 3/2−#
|
|
|-
| 86Ga
| style="text-align:right" | 31
| style="text-align:right" | 55
| 85.96312(86)#
| 30# ms [>300 ns]
|
|
|
|
|

 Commercially available materials may have been subjected to an undisclosed or inadvertent isotopic fractionation. Substantial deviations from the given mass and composition can occur.

Gallium-67
Gallium-67 has a half-life of 3.26 days and decays by electron capture and gamma emission (in de-excitation) to stable zinc-67. It is a radiopharmaceutical used in gallium scans (alternatively, the shorter-lived gallium-68 may be used). This gamma-emitting isotope is imaged by gamma camera.

Gallium-68
Gallium-68 is a positron emitter with a half-life of 68 minutes, decaying to stable zinc-68. It is a radiopharmaceutical, generated in situ from the electron capture of germanium-68 (half-life 271 days) owing to its short half-life. This positron-emitting isotope can be imaged efficiently by PET scan (see gallium scan); alternatively, the longer-lived gallium-67 may be used. Gallium-68 is only used as a positron emitting tag for a ligand which binds to certain tissues, such as DOTATOC, which is a somatostatin analogue useful for imaging neuroendocrine tumors. Gallium-68 DOTA scans are increasingly replacing octreotide scans (a type of indium-111 scan using octreotide as a somatostatin receptor ligand). The  is bound to a chemical such as DOTATOC and the positrons it emits are imaged by PET-CT scan. Such scans are useful in locating neuroendocrine tumors and pancreatic cancer. Thus, octreotide scanning for NET tumors is being increasingly replaced by gallium-68 DOTATOC scan.

References 

 Isotope masses from:

 Isotopic compositions and standard atomic masses from:

 Half-life, spin, and isomer data selected from the following sources.

 
Gallium
Gallium